Acila is a genus of marine bivalves in the family Nuculidae. Acila fossils have been found dating back to 113.0 Ma ago.

Species 
As of March, 2021, the genus contains these species:
Acila castrensis Hinds, 1843
Acila divaricata Hinds, 1843
Acila fultoni E. A. Smith, 1892
Acila granulata E. A. Smith, 1906
Acila insignis Gould, 1861
Acila jucunda Thiele, 1931
Acila minutoides Kuroda & Habe in Habe, 1958
Acila mirabilis A. Adams & Reeve, 1850
Acila vigilia Schenck, 1936

References

Nuculidae
Bivalve genera